Reg Goodes (28 July 1928 – 7 November 1996) was an  Australian rules footballer who played with South Melbourne in the Victorian Football League (VFL).

Notes

External links 

1928 births
1996 deaths
Australian rules footballers from Victoria (Australia)
Sydney Swans players